First Presbyterian Church is a historic church at 1100 1st Avenue in Columbus, Georgia.  The church is affiliated with the PCUSA.  Its building was added to the National Register of Historic Places in 1980.

The congregation had worshipped in two previous church buildings before having its current building built, at cost of more than $30,000.  It was dedicated in 1862.  The building was damaged by fire in November 1891 but was fully restored by February 1893.

It was listed on the National Register along with other historic properties identified in a large survey.

References

External links
Official Website

Presbyterian churches in Georgia (U.S. state)
Churches on the National Register of Historic Places in Georgia (U.S. state)
Churches completed in 1862
19th-century Presbyterian church buildings in the United States
Churches in Columbus, Georgia
1862 establishments in Georgia (U.S. state)
National Register of Historic Places in Muscogee County, Georgia